Violette Nozière (11 January 1915 – 26 November 1966) was a French woman who was convicted of murdering her father. The 1978 film of the same name, was based on this case. She accused her father of having sexually abused her, making it one of the first cases of incest to appear in the French modern press.

Life
Nozière was a bright child who gradually became more wayward. As a young woman, she was indulged by her parents and led a life subsidised by occasional prostitution. As a result, she contracted syphilis and when she became ill. her doctor felt obliged to tell her parents. Nozière persuaded a doctor to certify that she was still a virgin in order to persuade her parents that her disease was hereditary. Her parents believed this and Nozière continued to subsidise her lifestyle.

There is a chance she didn't even have syphilis because it is known that the specific test she was given quite often gave a false positive especially if the person being tested had tuberculosis, as she did. The fact that she bore five children tends to back up the idea that she did not have syphilis although it can become less malign after several years.

Murder
On March 23, 1933, when she was eighteen she bought the sleep-inducing drug Soménal and persuaded her parents to take an overdose of it by explaining that it was medicine that had been given to them by their doctor to cure the family's syphilis. The dose turned out to be too low, so on August 21 of the same year she tried to poison them using rat poison. Nozière then went out for the evening to stay at a hotel and when she returned to the flat she found her parents inert bodies. She turned on the gas and when the smell was overpowering she went to a nearby flat where she said that she thought that her parents had tried to commit suicide.

Her father, Jean-Baptiste, who had been an engine driver, died: but his wife, Germaine, recovered. The murder case and Nozière's lifestyle was the main story in the newspapers. The following year she was convicted and sentenced to death but the sentence was gradually reduced, first to hard labour for life in 1934, then to 12 years in 1942. She was released in 1945.

Legacy
The case remains prominent in French culture.

In 1978, director Claude Chabrol made a film based on this case.

References

1915 births
1966 deaths
People from Nièvre
20th-century criminals
French female murderers
French prostitutes
Patricides
People convicted of murder by France
Poisoners